Quelmes is a commune in the Pas-de-Calais department in the Hauts-de-France region of France.

Geography
Quelmes lies about 5 miles (8 km) west of Saint-Omer, at the junction of the D208 and D207 roads and bordered by the A26 motorway.

Population

Places of interest
 The church of St.Pierre, dating from the thirteenth century.

See also
Communes of the Pas-de-Calais department

References

Communes of Pas-de-Calais